Marvan Kandi (also Romanized as Marvān Kandī) is a village in Marhemetabad-e Jonubi Rural District, in the Central District of Miandoab County, West Azerbaijan Province, Iran. At the 2006 census, its population was 324, in 63 families.

References 

Populated places in Miandoab County